Paullinic acid is an omega-7 fatty acid find in a variety of plant sources, including guarana (Paullinia cupana) from which it gets its name.  It is one of a number of eicosenoic acids.

See also
 11-Eicosenoic acid

References

Fatty acids
Alkenoic acids